Big Bone Lick State Park is located at Big Bone in Boone County, Kentucky. The name of the park comes from the Pleistocene megafauna fossils found there. Mammoths are believed to have been drawn to this location by a salt lick deposited around the sulfur springs.  Other animals including forms of bison, caribou, deer, elk, horse, mastodon, moose, musk ox, peccary, ground sloths, wolves, black bears, stag moose, saber-toothed cats, and possibly tapir also grazed the vegetation and salty earth around the springs that the animals relied on for their diet. One mastodon bone was unearthed here with a noticeable cut mark on it, implying that the Clovis people lived in the area thousands of years ago. The area near the springs was very soft and marshy causing many animals to become stuck with no way to escape. It bills itself as "the birthplace of American paleontology", a term which dates from the 1807 expedition by William Clark undertaken at the direction of President Thomas Jefferson. In Nicholas Cresswell's journal, dated 1774 to 1777, he records a visit in 1775 to what was then called "Elephant Bone Lick." In this account, Cresswell describes finding several bones of "prodigious size", as well as tusk fragments, and teeth—one weighing approximately 10 pounds. While he assumed the bones were from ancient elephants, the local native traditions claimed the bones to be those of white buffaloes that had been poisoned by the salty water.

In 2002, the National Park Service designated Big Bone Lick State Park as an official Lewis and Clark Heritage Trail Site. The park was also listed in 1972 on the National Register of Historic Places and was further listed as a National Natural Landmark in February 2009.

Activities and amenities
The visitors center (opened 2004) features indoor and outdoor exhibits of fossils, American art, and a 1,000 pound mastodon skull as well as a gift shop.

The park features several nature trails, including a Discovery Trail that includes a boardwalk around a marsh bog diorama with recreations of a woolly mammoth, a mastodon, a ground sloth, bison, and scavengers feeding on carcasses and skeletal remains. The Discovery Trail winds through several habitats, including grassland, wetland and savanna, and is accessible to the physically challenged.

A small bison herd is also maintained on-site.

The park has picnicking facilities and a 62-site campground.

References

External links
Big Bone Lick State Historic Site Kentucky Department of Parks
Big Bone Lick State Park National Park Service
Thomas Jefferson Fossil Collection The Academy of Natural Sciences
History and Documents from Big Bone, Kentucky

Parks on the National Register of Historic Places in Kentucky
Protected areas of Boone County, Kentucky
Paleontology in Kentucky
State parks of Kentucky
National Register of Historic Places in Boone County, Kentucky
Cenozoic paleontological sites of North America
Pleistocene paleontological sites
Protected areas established in 1960
Museums in Boone County, Kentucky
Natural history museums in Kentucky
National Natural Landmarks in Kentucky
Geography of Boone County, Kentucky
1960 establishments in Kentucky
Fossil parks in the United States